Stokesville Observatory  is an astronomical observatory owned by H. D. Riddleberger of Harrisonburg, VA.  It is located in Stokesville Campground in Stokesville near Mount Solon,  Virginia (USA). The location is adjacent to the George Washington National Forest.

The observatory has one  silo-type room housing a 14-inch Celestron Compustar telescope owned by James Madison University under a powered Ash observatory dome. An adjoining shaped room houses astronomy displays and materials used for instructional classes. The building is surrounded by a circle of 8 powered piers for mounting additional telescopes.

See also 
List of observatories

References

External links
  Celestron Compustar Fan site
  Shenandoah Valley Stargazers who use and support the observatory
 James Madison Physics Department

Astronomical observatories in Virginia